Rębowo  is a settlement in the administrative district of Gmina Kłodawa, within Gorzów County, Lubusz Voivodeship, in western Poland.

The settlement has a population of 1.

References

Villages in Gorzów County